Pachymelania aurita is a species of freshwater snail, a gastropod mollusk in the family Thiaridae.

Description
These freshwater snails mainly feed on blue-green algae, diatoms and organic debris.

Distribution and habitat
This species is widespread along the Western Africa coasts, in Mauritania, Ivory Coast Cameroon, Democratic Republic of the Congo, Nigeria and Gabon. It lives in mangrove swamps, lagoons and brackish tidal waters.

References

External links

Encyclopaedia of Life
Biolib

Thiaridae
Gastropods described in 1774
Taxa named by Otto Friedrich Müller